Lothar Collatz (July 6, 1910 – September 26, 1990) was a German mathematician, born in Arnsberg, Westphalia.

The "3x + 1" problem is also known as the Collatz conjecture, named after him and still unsolved. The Collatz–Wielandt formula for the Perron–Frobenius eigenvalue of a positive square matrix was also named after him.

Collatz's 1957 paper with Ulrich Sinogowitz, who had been killed in the bombing of Darmstadt in World War II, founded the field of spectral graph theory.

Biography
Collatz studied at universities in Germany including University of Greifswald and the University of Berlin, where he was supervised by Alfred Klose, receiving his doctorate in 1935 for a dissertation entitled Das Differenzenverfahren mit höherer Approximation für lineare Differentialgleichungen (The finite difference method with higher approximation for linear differential equations). He then worked as an assistant at the University of Berlin, before moving to the Technical University of Karlsruhe in 1935 where he remained through 1937. From 1938 to 1943, he worked as a Privatdozent in Karlsruhe. In the war years he worked with Alwin Walther at the Institute for Practical Mathematics of the Technische Hochschule Darmstadt.

From 1943 to 1952, Collatz held a chair at the Technical University of Hannover. From 1952 until his retirement in 1978 Collatz worked at the University of Hamburg, where he founded the Institute of Applied Mathematics in 1953. After retirement as professor emeritus he continued to be very active at mathematical conferences.

For his many contributions to the field, Collatz had many honors bestowed upon him in his lifetime, including:

 election to the Academy of Sciences Leopoldina, the Academy of Sciences of the Institute of Bologna, and the Academy at Modena in Italy
 honorary member of the Hamburg Mathematical Society
 honorary degrees by the University of São Paulo, the Technical University of Vienna, the University of Dundee in Scotland, Brunel University in England, the Leibniz University Hannover in 1981, and the Technical University of Dresden.

He died unexpectedly from a heart attack in Varna, Bulgaria, while attending a mathematics conference.

Selected works

 Das Differenzenverfahren mit höherer Approximation für lineare Differentialgleichungen (= Schriften des mathematischen Seminars und des Instituts für angewandte Mathematik der Universität Berlin Band 3/Heft 1), Leipzig 1935
 Eigenwertprobleme und ihre numerische Behandlung. Leipzig 1945
 Eigenwertaufgaben mit technischen Anwendungen. Leipzig 1949, 1963
 Numerische Behandlung von Differentialgleichungen. Berlin 1951, 1955 (Eng. trans. 1966)
 Differentialgleichungen für Ingenieure. Stuttgart 1960
 with Wolfgang Wetterling: Optimierungsaufgaben Berlin 1966, 1971 (Eng. trans. 1975)
 Funktionalanalysis und Numerische Mathematik. Berlin 1964
 Differentialgleichungen. Eine Einführung unter besonderer Berücksichtigung der Anwendungen. Stuttgart, Teubner Verlag, 1966, 7th edn. 1990
 with Julius Albrecht: Aufgaben aus der angewandten Mathematik I. Gleichungen in einer und mehreren Variablen. Approximationen. Berlin 1972
 Numerische Methoden der Approximationstheorie. vol. 2. Vortragsauszüge der Tagung über Numerische Methoden der Approximationstheorie vom 3.-9. Juni 1973 im Mathematischen Forschungsinstitut Oberwolfach, Stuttgart 1975
 Approximationstheorie: Tschebyscheffsche Approximation und Anwendungen. Teubner 1973

References

Sources
Lothar Collatz (July 6, 1910 – September 26, 1990), Journal of Approximation Theory, vol. 65, issue 1, April 1991, page II by Günter Meinardus and Günther Nürnberger

Further reading
 J Albrecht, P Hagedorn and W Velte, Lothar Collatz (German), Numerical treatment of eigenvalue problems, vol. 5, Oberwolfach, 1990 (Birkhäuser, Basel, 1991), viii–ix. 
 I Althoefer, Lothar Collatz zwischen 1933 und 1950 - Eine Teilbiographie (German), 3-Hirn-Verlag, Lage (Lippe), 2019.
 R Ansorge, Lothar Collatz (6 July 1910 – 26 September 1990) (German), Mitt. Ges. Angew. Math. Mech. No. 1 (1991), 4–9. 
 U Eckhardt, Der Einfluss von Lothar Collatz auf die angewandte Mathematik, Numerical mathematics, Sympos., Inst. Appl. Math., Univ. Hamburg, Hamburg, 1979 (Birkhäuser, Basel-Boston, Mass., 1979), 9–23. 
 L Elsner and K P Hadeler, Lothar Collatz on the occasion of his 75th birthday, Linear Algebra Appl. 68 (1985), vi; 1–8. 
 R B Guenther, Obituary : Lothar Collatz, 1910–1990, Aequationes Mathematicae 43 (2–3) (1992), 117–119. 
 H Heinrich, Zum siebzigsten Geburtstag von Lothar Collatz, Z. Angew. Math. Mech. 60 (5) (1980), 274–275. 
 G Meinardus, G Nürnberger, Th Riessinger and G Walz, In memoriam : the work of Lothar Collatz in approximation theory, J. Approx. Theory 67 (2) (1991), 119–128. 
 G Meinardus and G Nürnberger, In memoriam : Lothar Collatz (July 6, 1910 – September 26, 1990), J. Approx. Theory 65 (1) (1991), i; 1–2. 
 J R Whiteman, In memoriam : Lothar Collatz, Internat. J. Numer. Methods Engrg. 31 (8) (1991), 1475–1476.

External links
 
 

1910 births
1990 deaths
20th-century German mathematicians
People from Arnsberg
People from the Province of Westphalia
Academic staff of Technische Universität Darmstadt
Academic staff of the University of Hamburg
Academic staff of the Karlsruhe Institute of Technology
Humboldt University of Berlin alumni
Academic staff of the University of Hanover
University of Greifswald alumni
German mathematicians
Graph theorists